Sergei Alekseevich Savateev (13 August 1983; Leningrad, USSR) is a Russian interior designer.

Biography 
Sergei Savateev was born on 13 August 1983 in Leningrad, USSR.

Education 

In 2006, he graduated from the Peter the Great St. Petersburg Polytechnic University, and by that time he had been employed with Almaz Central Marine Design Bureau in the position of an engineer for 2 years.

Career 

After the completion of training, Sergei Savateev quit the engineering business and started a private designer practice as well as collaboration with architecture and design companies. 
 
In 2014, the studio was renamed into SAVATEEV DESIGN.

Projects both in Russia and abroad have been completed: in Moscow, St. Petersburg, Sochi, Ufa, United States, Germany, Finland, Israel. At the moment, Sergei's projects are regularly covered by prestigious interior-design magazines.

In December 2019, Sergey Savateev won the National Design Championship of Russia, taking first place.

Sergei Savateev is winner in Interior Space and Exhibition Design Category by A’Design Award & Competition.

Awards

References

External links 
 Official website

Living people
1983 births
Businesspeople from Saint Petersburg
Interior designers